Fragrant World is the third studio album by American psychedelic pop band Yeasayer, released on August 21, 2012, on Secretly Canadian.

Critical reception
The album has received a provisional score of 71 from Metacritic indicating "generally favorable reviews", based on the reviews of 44 critics.

Track listing

Personnel

Yeasayer
Chris Keating – lead vocals (1, 2, 4, 6, 7, 8 and 11),  backing vocals (3, 5, 9 and 10), Maschine synth (1, 3, 4, 5, 6, 9, 10 and 11), drum programming (2, 3, 4, 6 and 8), synthesizer (2, 4, 5 and 8) , Jupiter (7)
Anand Wilder – lead vocals (3, 5, 9 and 10), backing vocals (1, 2, 4, 6, 7, 8 and 11), guitar (1, 4, 8, 9 and 11), piano (1), Nord (1), Juno 106 (3, 4, 9 and 10), Jupiter MKS-80 (3), Korg MS-20 (3), Farfisa (3), Boss Supershifter (3), organ (4), cello (5), drum programming (5), Electribe (6), synthesizer (6), trident piano (7), ARP Omni 2 (7), talk box (8), celeste (9), 12-string guitar (10), Rhodes (10), mellotron (10)
Ira Wolf Tuton – J bass (2, 4, 5, 7, 9, 10 and 11), backing vocals (1, 2, 3, 4, 5, 8, 9 and 10), melodyne vocals (1), Omnisphere (9 and 10), Harmonic Octave Generator (4), Roland SH-2 (5), bass synthesizer (6), Roland SH-101 (7), ARP 2600 (7), tambourine (7),  Moog Murf (9), piano (10)

Additional musicians
Jason Trammell – drums (2, 4 and 7), percussion (6), MPC (11)
Ahmed Gallab – percussion (6)
Brian McOmber – drums (2, 4 and 9), percussion (9)
Dan Carey – MPC (3 and 5)
Al Carlson – melodyne (4), saxophone (10)
Kishi Bashi – strings (2)
"Delicate" Steve Marion – guitar (3)
Elliot Bergman – kalimba (5)

Recording personnel
Yeasayer – producer
Al Carlson – recording
Abe Seiferth – additional recording
Alexis Smith – engineer
Dan Carey – mixing

Artwork
Ana Maria Lucaciu – modeling
Jason Nocito – photography
Other Means – design

Charts

References

2012 albums
Yeasayer albums
Secretly Canadian albums